The 1935–36 season was Union Sportive Musulmane Blidéenne's 3rd season in existence. The club played in the Third Division for the 3rd season in the French colonial era, as well as the North African Cup, in which the club was knocked out in the first round.

Competitions

League table

Overview

Third Division

Matches

Play-off

Third Place

Play-off

North African Cup

References

External links
La Presse libre (Alger)
L'Indépendant
L'Echo d'Alger
Le Tell

USM Blida seasons
Algerian football clubs 1935–36 season